Bryum funckii is a species of moss belonging to the family Bryaceae.

Taxonomy

Synonyms
Bryum confertum Limpr.

References

funckii